Cherrystone may refer to:

Places
 Cherrystone, Virginia, United States, an unincorporated community
 Cherrystone Bar Light, a former lighthouse
 Little Cherrystone, a historic home in Chatham, Virginia, United States
 Cherrystone Kingdom, a fictional nation in 2019 turn-based tactics video game Wargroove

Other uses
 Cherrystone, a size classification of hard clam
 Commander Cherrystone, an antagonist in 1995 American novel Wicked (Maguire novel)